Advanced Placement (AP) Human Geography (also known as AP Human Geo, AP Geography, APHG, AP HuGe, AP HuG, AP Human, or HGAP) is an Advanced Placement social studies course in human geography for high school students in the US, culminating in an exam administered by the College Board.

The course introduces students to the systematic study of patterns and processes that have shaped human understanding, use, and alteration of Earth's surface. Students employ spatial concepts and landscape analyses to analyze human social organization and its environmental consequences while also learning about the methods and tools geographers use in their science and practice.

Exam 
The AP Human Geography Exam consists of two sections. The first section consists of 60 multiple choice questions and the second section consists of 3 free-response questions. The sections are 60 and 75 minutes long, respectively. It is not necessary to answer the free-response questions in essay form; instead, points are awarded on certain keywords, examples, and other vital aspects.

Curriculum and Course Outline
The curriculum consists of informational book-related homework, which often requires students to strive to learn information independently. The curriculum teaches about diffusion, human traits, religion, and population clusters.

The topics covered by the exam are as follows:

Course Outline

Grade distribution
The exam was first held in 2001. Grade distributions for the Human Geography scores since 2010 were:

References

Secondary education in the United States
High school course levels
Human geography
Geography education in the United States
Advanced Placement